The Doobon coat (Hebrew: מעיל דובון | me'eel Doobon), also designated the Dubon military cold weather parka, Dubon winter parka, Dubon parka or IDF winter parka is a windproof military winter coat, made with padded nylon cover with cloth lining waterproof outer layer of filling between them isolated synthetic fibers. This coat has a regular hood. This is a coat designed for people who stay outdoors for a long time on cold days, such as soldiers and laborers. The meaning of the name Doobon in Hebrew is 'Little Bear' because of its puffy figure and synthetic fur.

Background
This coat was first produced in 1971 by the Logistics Corps for the Israel Defense Forces soldiers, and is a part of the Israel Defense Forces mess dress. It replaced the heavy woolen Greatcoat and the United States Battledress coat. The original Doobon coat colors were olive for most soldiers and blue for the air force and navy. These are almost the only colors it comes in, to date, although Khagor ("חגור") Ltd. received a concession to use the brand Doobon for coats sold both to the IDF and to civilians.

Civilian use
Outside the army, this coat is worn mostly by Israeli civilians who have to stay outdoors for long hours on winter time, and by those who belong to Zionist groups that manifest opposing trendy and fashion clothing. The Doobon coat is a sign of Modern Orthodox Judaism and residents of the Israeli settlements, as well as for socialist Zionists, including Kibbutz members.

The Doobon coat symbolizes being an Israeli in the work of various artists, including those of Yehonatan Geffen. In his Ballad of Druze, he rhymed the words Druze (in Hebrew "Droozy" דרוזי) and Uzi, and phrased "Well, with the Doobon and the Uzi, who can see he is a Druze?"

Combat use
The Argentine Army ordered in the early 1980s some 200,000 parkas of a commercially produced version of the Dubon, made under contract in Israel by ISREX Ltd, which were issued to Argentine infantry units during the Falklands War, but later they produced their own version.

Users

 : used by the Argentine Army.
 : used by the Israel Defense Forces and Israel security forces.
 : used by the Turkish Land Forces.
 : used by the Palestinian National Security Forces.

Former users
  Lebanese Forces: provided by Israel (1978-1993).
  People's Liberation Army (Lebanon): captured from the Lebanese Forces (1983-1993).
  South Lebanon Army: provided by Israel (1978-2000).

See also
 Ephod Combat Vest
 Tembel hat
 OR-201
 M-1965 field jacket

Notes

References

 David Campbell & Peter Dennis, Israeli Paratroopers 1954-2016, Elite series 224, Osprey Publishing Ltd, Oxford 2018. 
 John Laffin & Mike Chappell, The Israeli Army in the Middle East Wars 1948-73, Men-at-Arms series 127, Osprey Publishing Ltd, London 1982. 
 Lee Russel & Sam Katz, Israeli Defense Forces – 1948 to the present, Uniforms Illustrated No 12, Arms and Armour Press Ltd, London 1985. 
 Nicholas Van Der Bijl & Paul Hannon, Argentine Forces in the Falklands, Men-at-Arms series 250, Osprey Publishing Ltd, London 1992. 
 Samuel M. Katz & Ron Volstad, Armies in Lebanon 1982-84, Men-at-Arms series 165, Osprey Publishing Ltd, London 1985. 
 Samuel M. Katz & Ron Volstad, Arab Armies of the Middle East Wars 2, Men-at-Arms series 194, Osprey Publishing Ltd, London 1988. 
 Samuel M. Katz & Ron Volstad, Israeli Elite Forces since 1948, Elite series 18, Osprey Publishing Ltd, London 1988. 
 Samuel M. Katz & Ron Volstad, Israeli Defense Forces since 1973, Elite series 8, Osprey Publishing Ltd, London 1990. 
 Samuel M. Katz & Ron Volstad, Battleground Lebanon (1003), Concord Publications, Hong Kong 1990. 
 Samuel M. Katz & Ron Volstad, Israel's Cutting Edge (1005), Concord Publications, Hong Kong 1990. 
 Samuel M. Katz & Ron Volstad, Tools of the Trade – The Weapons, Gear & Uniforms of the IDF (1016), Concord Publications, Hong Kong 1991.

External links
Dubon military cold weather parka
IDF cold weather hooded parka

Coats (clothing)
Israeli culture
Israel Defense Forces
Israeli inventions
Israeli fashion
Military uniforms